Noble Webster Doss (May 22, 1920 – February 15, 2009) was an American football halfback who played professionally for the Philadelphia Eagles of the National Football League (NFL) and the New York Yankees of the All-America Football Conference (AAFC). He played college football at Texas.

References

External links

 NFL.com profile
 

1920 births
2009 deaths
American football halfbacks
Georgia Pre-Flight Skycrackers football players
New York Yankees (AAFC) players
Philadelphia Eagles players
Texas Longhorns football players
People from Temple, Texas
Players of American football from Texas